As Long as the Waters Flow is a 1989 bronze sculpture by Allan Houser, installed outside the Oklahoma State Capitol in Oklahoma City, in the U.S. state of Oklahoma. The statue, which depicts a Native American woman, was dedicated in 1989.

See also
 1989 in art

References

External links
 
 As Long As The Waters Flow at The Historical Marker Database

1989 establishments in Oklahoma
1989 sculptures
Bronze sculptures in Oklahoma
Outdoor sculptures in Oklahoma City
Sculptures of Native Americans
Sculptures of women in Oklahoma
Statues in Oklahoma